Pandemonium is the twelfth studio album by Danish hard rock/heavy metal band Pretty Maids. The album was released on 14 May 2010 on Frontiers Records. Lead singer Ronnie Atkins has called the album "the best album we've done in something like 15 or 20 years".

The album debuted at number 83 on the German Albums Chart, becoming Pretty Maids' first album to chart in more than 10 years (since Anything Worth Doing Is Worth Overdoing in 1999). In their native Denmark, the album debuted at number 14 and became Pretty Maids' highest-charting album since Scream (1994) which charted at number 27.

Track listing

Personnel
Ronnie Atkins – vocals
Ken Hammer – guitars
Kenn Jackson – bass
Allan Tschicaja – drums
Morten Sandager – keyboards, assistant engineer
Jacob Hansen – producer, mixer, mastering, engineer, additional guitars
Jeppe Andersson – assistant engineer
Martin Pagaard Wolff – drum technician

Charts

References

2010 albums
Pretty Maids albums
Frontiers Records albums